Caladium bicolor, called Heart of Jesus, is a species in the genus Caladium from Latin America. It is grown as a houseplant for its large, heart or lance-shaped leaves with striking green, white, pink, and red blotching. Hundreds of cultivars are available. (See List of Caladium cultivars.) It can be planted outside in USDA Hardiness Zone 10 as an ornamental. It is a problematic invasive species in Trinidad and Tobago, Guam, Micronesia, Palau, Hawaii and the Philippines, and naturalized populations can be found in most of the rest of the world's tropics, including Africa, the Indian subcontinent, southeast Asia and Malesia.

Toxicity 
C. bicolor contains calcium oxalate crystals, making all parts of the plant poisonous to humans, livestock, and pets. Sap coming in contact with the skin may cause skin irritation. Ingestion may cause burning and swelling of the lips, mouth, and tongue, as well as nausea, vomiting, and diarrhea. If a pet consumes caladium, in addition to vomiting, etc., the symptoms include drooling, pawing at mouth or face, and decreased appetite.

References

bicolor
Ornamental plants
Plants described in 1801